Khvoshnam (also Romanized as Khvoshnām) is a village in Itivand-e Jonubi Rural District, Kakavand District, Delfan County, Lorestan Province, Iran. At the 2006 census, its population was 326, in 51 families.

References 

Towns and villages in Delfan County